Sylva Fischerová (born 5 November 1963, Prague) is a Czech poet, prose writer, editor, anthologist, and teacher and translator of Classical literature and philosophy. She is the official City Poet of Prague.

Life 

Fischerová was born on November 5, 1963 and grew up in Olomouc. She studied French at a language school in Brno, and in 1983 began studies in Philosophy at the Charles University Faculty of Arts in Prague and Physics at the CU Faculty of Mathematics and Physics; in 1985 she transferred to Classical Philology at the same university, where in 1991 she received her M.A., writing her thesis on “The problem of unity of arete in Plato (the Protagorus dialogue)”.
She did her post-graduate studies at the same faculty, writing her doctoral dissertation on “Can the Muses Lie? (The Muses in the prooemion of Hesiod’s Theogony)”.

Since 1992 she has been employed as an assistant professor at the Institute of Greek and Latin Studies at Charles University Prague. At present she lectures on Classical Greek literature, religion and philosophy. She is the author of eleven collections of poetry, as well as short stories, novels, and books for children.

Her book-long interview with philosopher Karel Floss won the Czech Literary Foundation Prize in 2011.

In 2018 she was named the first City Poet of Prague.

Family 
Her half-sister Viola Fischerová was also a poet; and Sylva was sister-in-law to writers Karel Michal and Josef Jedlička via marriage to Viola.

Her daughter Ester Fischerová is also a poet, with two collections of poetry published to date.

Literary Works

Poetry, Prose, Books for Children
 Chvění závodních koní (1986)
 Velká zrcadla (1990)
 V podsvětním městě (1994)
 Šance (1999)
 Zázrak (2005)
 Krvavý koleno (2005)
 Júla a Hmýza (2006)
 Anděl na okně (2007)
 Tady za rohem to všechno je (2011)
 Pasáž (2011)
 Egbérie a Olténie (2011)
 Evropa je jako židle Thonet, Amerika je pravý úhel (2012)
 Mare (2013)
 Sestra duše (2015)
 Bizom aneb Služba a mise (2016)
 Světový orloj (2017)
 Kostel pro kuřáky/A Church for Smokers (2019)

Critical Studies 
 Původ poezie (2006), ed. Sylva Fischerová and Jiří Starý  
 Mýtus a geografie (2008) ed. Sylva Fischerová and Jiří Starý  
 Hippokratés. Vybrané spisy I (2012) ed. Hynek Bartoš and Sylva Fischerová
 Medicína mezi jedinečným a univerzálním (2012), ed. Aleš Beran and Sylva Fischerová
 Starodávné bejlí. Obrysy populární a brakové literatury ve starověku a středověku (2016), ed. Sylva Fischerová and Jiří Starý
 Hippokratés. Vybrané spisy II (2018) ed. Hynek Bartoš and Sylva Fischerová

Interviews 
 Floss, Karel, Fischerová, Sylva: Bůh vždycky zatřese stavbou, Vyšehrad Prague, 2011,

Works in Translation
 The Tremor of Racehorses: Selected Poems (UK, Bloodaxe Books, 1990)
 Att leva: Dikter om frihet (with Denise Levertov and Frances Horowitz; Sweden, Studiekamratens, 1994)
 Cud (Poland, ATUT, 2008)
 The Swing in the Middle of Chaos (UK, Bloodaxe Books, 2010)
 Dood, waar is je wapen? (The Netherlands, Voetnoot, 2011)
 Stomach of the Soul (USA, Calypso Editions, 2014)	
 Europa ein Thonet Stuhl, Amerika ein rechter Winkel: Ein poetischer Roadtrip durch die Neue Welt (Germany, Balaena 2018)
 Die Weltuhr. Gedichte (Germany, Klak Verlag 2019)
 Kostel pro kuřáky/A Church for Smokers (bilingual edition, Prague, Novela Bohemica 2019)
 "Two Poems" ["The World Clock and the Animated Machine: Olomouc", "Old and New England"], Modern Poetry in Translation 2:2020.

References

External links 
 Official City Poet of Prague 
 Sylva Fischerová at CzechLit
 Radio Prague interview with Sylva Fischerová by David Vaughan: America is a Right Angle
 Radio Prague interview with Sylva Fischerová by David Vaughan: Irony Sips Whiskey
 Interview with Sylva Fischerová by SJ Fowler for Maintenant 88
 Sylva Fischerová reading in Dublin (Bloodaxe Books Vimeo)
 Sylva Fischerová reading her poem "Time" (June 2012) in the series Lunch Poems at Poetry Parnassus in London (YouTube)

1963 births
20th-century Czech poets
21st-century Czech poets
Czech women poets
Living people
Writers from Prague
Writers from Olomouc
Charles University alumni